Konstantin V. Kostin (born 4 September 1973) is a Latvian figure skater. He competed for the Soviet Union through 1991 and then for Latvia from 1992 to the end of his career in 2001. He is the 1992 World Junior silver medalist and 1992 Karl Schäfer Memorial bronze medalist.

Personal life 
Kostin was born on 4 September 1973 in Riga, Latvia. He studied psychology in Russia at the Moscow Sociological Institute.

Career

Competitive 
Early in his career, Kostin represented the Soviet Union. He won the silver medal at the 1992 World Junior Championships, held in late 1991 in Hull, Canada.

He first competed for Latvia in January 1992, placing 9th at the European Championships in Lausanne, Switzerland. In February, he placed 20th at the 1992 Winter Olympics in Albertville, France. At the start of the following season, he was awarded the bronze medal at the 1992 Karl Schäfer Memorial.

Kostin's highest continental placement was 4th, which he achieved at the 1993 European Championships in Helsinki, Finland. His highest placement at the World Figure Skating Championships was 13th, in that same year. He competed at five World Championships (1992, 1993, 1997, 2000 and 2001). 

Kostin finished 8th at his sole Grand Prix event, the 2000 Trophée Lalique.

Post-competitive 
Kostin has served as the director of skating at the Yarmouth Ice Club in Kingston, Massachusetts, and an international technical specialist for Latvia. He coached Michelle Boulos.

Competitive highlights 
GP: Grand Prix

References 

 Skatabase: 1990s Olympics
 Skatabase: 1990s Europeans
 Skatabase: 1990s Worlds

Soviet male single skaters
Latvian male single skaters
Olympic figure skaters of Latvia
Figure skaters at the 1992 Winter Olympics
International Skating Union technical specialists
Living people
1973 births
Sportspeople from Riga
World Junior Figure Skating Championships medalists